This is a list of newspapers in Bolivia.

Current newspapers 

Ahora el Pueblo — state-funded
Bolivian Express (La Paz) 
El Chaqueño (Tarija)
Correo del Sur (Sucre)
El Deber (Santa Cruz de la Sierra)
El Diario (La Paz) — began publication 5 April 1904; oldest currently in circulation
La Estrella de Oriente (Santa Cruz de la Sierra)
Hoy
Jornada (La Paz) — began publication February 1948
La Misión
El Mundo (Santa Cruz de la Sierra)
El Nacional (Tarija)
El Nuevo Día (Santa Cruz de la Sierra)
Nuevo Sur (Tarija)
Opinión (Cochabamba)
Página Siete (La Paz)  — began publication April 2010
El País (Tarija)
La Palabra de Beni
La Patria (Oruro) — began publication 19 March 1919
La Prensa (La Paz)
La Razón (La Paz)  — began publication 17 February 1917
El Sol (Santa Cruz de la Sierra)
Los Tiempos (Cochabamba)  — began publication September 1943
El Tunari (weekly; Quillacollo) — began publication 26 February 2011

Defunct newspapers 

 Última Hora  — began publication 30 April 1929; ceased 2001
 Cambio — began publication 22 January 2009; ceased 2019; state-funded
 Bandera Roja — socialist newspaper from 1926–27

See also
List of newspapers

References

Further reading

External links
 

Bolivia
Newspapers